Lamprotornis is a large genus of glossy-starlings all of which occur in Africa south of the Sahara. They have glossy blue or green upper parts, which is due to hollow melanin granules arranged in a single layer near the feather barbule's surface. This unique arrangement led to some glossy starlings formerly placed in the genus Spreo being transferred to Lamprotornis, since they shared this feature (but see also below).

The genus Lamprotornis was introduce by the Dutch zoologist Coenraad Jacob Temminck
in 1820. The type species was subsequently designated as the long-tailed glossy starling.

The under parts of these species lack iridescence. They may be blue, purple, yellow or brown. Most Lamprotornis starlings have striking yellow or red irides and some have long tails.

These glossy starlings are found in a variety of habitats from forests to open woodland and gardens. They nest in tree holes, either natural, or made by woodpeckers or barbets, and some will use man-made structures. Most species are resident apart from seasonal or local movement, but Shelley's starling is migratory. Most species are gregarious outside the breeding season.

Lamprotornis glossy-starlings are omnivorous and mostly feed on the ground, although they will take fruit from trees. Some will feed on or near large mammals to find insects.

Species
The genus contains 23 species.
Cape starling, Lamprotornis nitens
Greater blue-eared starling, Lamprotornis chalybaeus
Lesser blue-eared starling, Lamprotornis chloropterus
Miombo blue-eared starling, Lamprotornis elisabeth
Bronze-tailed starling, Lamprotornis chalcurus
Splendid starling, Lamprotornis splendidus
Principe starling, Lamprotornis ornatus
Emerald starling, Lamprotornis iris
Purple starling, Lamprotornis purpureus
Rüppell's starling, Lamprotornis purpuroptera
Long-tailed glossy starling, Lamprotornis caudatus
Golden-breasted starling, Lamprotornis regius
Meves's starling, Lamprotornis mevesii
Burchell's starling, Lamprotornis australis
Sharp-tailed starling, Lamprotornis acuticaudus
Superb starling, Lamprotornis superbus
Hildebrandt's starling, Lamprotornis hildebrandti
Shelley's starling, Lamprotornis shelleyi
Chestnut-bellied starling, Lamprotornis pulcher
Ashy starling, Lamprotornis unicolor
Fischer's starling, Lamprotornis fischeri
Pied starling, Lamprotornis bicolor
White-crowned starling, Lamprotornis albicapillus

The limits of this genus require revision. For example, the black-bellied starling is sometimes placed in a separate genus Notopholia, and it (and possibly others) appears to be indeed well distinct. On the other hand, genera such as Coccycolius, Spreo and Compsarus are sometimes included in Lamprotornis.(Zuccon et al. 2006)

References

Feare, Chris & Craig, Adrian (1999): Starlings and Mynas. Princeton University Press. ISBN 0-7136-3961-X
Zuccon, Dario; Cibois, Anne; Pasquet, Eric & Ericson, Per G.P. (2006): Nuclear and mitochondrial sequence data reveal the major lineages of starlings, mynas and related taxa. Molecular Phylogenetics and Evolution 41(2): 333–344.   (HTML abstract)

External links
 
 

 
Bird genera
Taxa named by Coenraad Jacob Temminck